The Lahore Qalandars cricket team is one of six teams that competed in the 2018 Pakistan Super League, representing Lahore, Punjab.

Team management retained Brendon McCullum as their captain. They finished sixth in the season after winning only three of their ten matches, and as a result, were eliminated in the group stage for the third consecutive year.

Squad
Players with international caps shown in bold
Ages given as of the first match of the season, 22 February 2018

Season standings

Points table

Season summary
Before, 2018 PSL players draft, team management had to retain maximum of ten players in their squad, and they retained Sunil Narine, Umar Akmal, Brendon McCullum, Yasir Shah, Sohail Khan, Cameron Delport, Aamer Yamin, Bilawal Bhatti and previous season's leading runs-scorer for the team Fakhar Zaman. Ghulam Mudassar was retained as team's emerging player.

At the players draft, held in Lahore, they managed to picked some good local and International players in their squad. Australia's Explosive opener, Chris Lynn was their first pick of the night, along with Angelo Mathews, Mitchell McClenaghan and Mustafizur Rahman and Pakistani players like Shaheen Afridi and Bilal Asif were also picked. However, few days before the season started, it was announced that Chris Lynn has suffered a shoulder injury, therefore, he was unavailable for the entire season. He was replaced by South Africa's Kyle Abbott.

References

External links

2018 in Punjab, Pakistan
2018 Pakistan Super League
Qalandars in 2018
2018